Pogonostoma is a genus of beetles in the family Cicindelidae, containing the following species:

 Pogonostoma abadiei Rivalier, 1965
 Pogonostoma affine W.Horn, 1893
 Pogonostoma alluaudi W.Horn, 1898
 Pogonostoma andreevae J.Moravec, 2007
 Pogonostoma andrei J.Moravec, 1999
 Pogonostoma angustum Fleutiaux, 1902
 Pogonostoma ankaranense Deuve, 1986
 Pogonostoma anthracinum (Castelnau & Gory, 1835)
 Pogonostoma atrorotundatum W.Horn, 1934
 Pogonostoma aureovirescens J.Moravec, 2007
 Pogonostoma basale Fleutiaux, 1899
 Pogonostoma basidilatatum W.Horn, 1909
 Pogonostoma beananae Rivalier, 1963
 Pogonostoma brevicorne W.Horn, 1898
 Pogonostoma brullei Laporte de Castelnau & Gory, 1837
 Pogonostoma caeruleum (Castelnau & Gory, 1835)
 Pogonostoma chalybaeum Klug, 1835
 Pogonostoma comptum Rivalier, 1970
 Pogonostoma cyanescens Klug, 1835
 Pogonostoma cylindricum Fleutiaux, 1899
 Pogonostoma delphinense Jeannel, 1946
 Pogonostoma densepunctatum Rivalier, 1970
 Pogonostoma deuvei J.Moravec, 2000
 Pogonostoma differens Cassola & Andriamampianina, 2001
 Pogonostoma dohnali J.Moravec, 2000
 Pogonostoma dolini J.Moravec, 2007
 Pogonostoma elegans (Brulle, 1834)
 Pogonostoma excisoclavipenis W.Horn, 1934
 Pogonostoma externospinosum W.Horn, 1927
 Pogonostoma fabiocassolai J.Moravec, 2003
 Pogonostoma flavomaculatum W.Horn, 1892
 Pogonostoma flavopalpale Jeannel, 1946
 Pogonostoma fleutiauxi W.Horn, 1905
 Pogonostoma geniculatum Jeannel, 1946
 Pogonostoma gibbosum Rivalier, 1970
 Pogonostoma gladiator W.Horn, 1934
 Pogonostoma globicolle Rivalier, 1970
 Pogonostoma globulithorax Jeannel, 1946
 Pogonostoma heteropunctatum Moravec, 2000
 Pogonostoma hirofumii J.Moravec, 2003
 Pogonostoma hornl Fleutiaux, 1899
 Pogonostoma humbloti Rivalier, 1970
 Pogonostoma impressum Rivalier, 1970
 Pogonostoma inerme Jeannel, 1946
 Pogonostoma infimum Rivalier, 1970
 Pogonostoma janvybirali J.Moravec, 2007
 Pogonostoma juergenwiesneri J.Moravec, 2007
 Pogonostoma kraatzi W.Horn, 1894
 Pogonostoma laportei W.Horn, 1900
 Pogonostoma levigatum W.Horn, 1908
 Pogonostoma levisculptum W.Horn, 1934
 Pogonostoma litigiosum Rivalier, 1970
 Pogonostoma longicolle Jeannel, 1946
 Pogonostoma maculicorne W.Horn, 1934
 Pogonostoma majunganum Jeannel, 1946
 Pogonostoma malleatum Rivalier, 1970
 Pogonostoma mathiauxi Jeannel, 1946
 Pogonostoma meridionale Fleutiaux, 1899
 Pogonostoma microtuberculatum W.Horn, 1934
 Pogonostoma minimum Fleutiaux, 1899
 Pogonostoma mocquerysi Fleutiaux, 1899
 Pogonostoma moestum Rivalier, 1970
 Pogonostoma nigricans Klug, 1835
 Pogonostoma ovicolle W.Horn, 1893
 Pogonostoma pallipes Rivalier, 1970
 Pogonostoma parallelum W.Horn, 1909
 Pogonostoma parexiguum J.Moravec, 2000
 Pogonostoma parvulum Rivalier, 1970
 Pogonostoma perrieri Fairmaire, 1900
 Pogonostoma perroti Rivalier, 1970
 Pogonostoma peyrierasi Rivalier, 1970
 Pogonostoma phalangioide Rivalier, 1970
 Pogonostoma pliskai J.Moravec, 2000
 Pogonostoma praetervisum J.Moravec, 2005
 Pogonostoma propinquum Rivalier, 1970
 Pogonostoma propripenis J.Moravec, 2000
 Pogonostoma pseudoinerme J.Moravec, 2000
 Pogonostoma pseudominimum W.Horn, 1934
 Pogonostoma pusillum Laporte de Castelnau & Gory, 1837
 Pogonostoma ranomafanense J.Moravec, 2007
 Pogonostoma rivalieri J.Moravec, 2005
 Pogonostoma rufidens Rivalier, 1970
 Pogonostoma rufomaxillaris Cassola & Andriamampianina, 1998
 Pogonostoma rugosiceps Rivalier, 1970
 Pogonostoma rugosoglabrum W.Horn, 1923
 Pogonostoma sambiranense Rivalier, 1965
 Pogonostoma sawadai J.Moravec, 2007
 Pogonostoma schaumi W.Horn, 1893
 Pogonostoma septentrionale Fleutiaux, 1903
 Pogonostoma sericeum Klug, 1835
 Pogonostoma sicardi W.Horn, 1927
 Pogonostoma sikorai W.Horn, 1894
 Pogonostoma simile Jeannel, 1946
 Pogonostoma simplex W.Horn, 1905
 Pogonostoma skrabali J.Moravec, 2000
 Pogonostoma spinipenne Laporte de Castelnau & Gory, 1837
 Pogonostoma srnkai W.Horn, 1893
 Pogonostoma subgibbosum Moravec, 2000
 Pogonostoma subtile W.Horn, 1904
 Pogonostoma subtiligrossum W.Horn, 1934
 Pogonostoma sudiferum Rivalier, 1965
 Pogonostoma surdum Rivalier, 1970
 Pogonostoma tortipenis W.Horn, 1934
 Pogonostoma vadoni Jeannel, 1946
 Pogonostoma vestitum Fairmaire, 1900
 Pogonostoma violaceolevigatum W.Horn, 1927
 Pogonostoma violaceum Fleutiaux, 1902
 Pogonostoma viridipenne Jeannel, 1946
 Pogonostoma vybirali J.Moravec, 2000
 Pogonostoma wiesneri J.Moravec, 2003
 Pogonostoma zasterai J.Moravec, 2000

References

Cicindelidae